Vrolijk is a Dutch surname meaning "cheerful". A variant form was Vrolik. People with the name include:

Jan Vrolijk (1917–1998), Dutch canoeist
Maarten Vrolijk (1919–1994), Dutch journalist, poet, and Labour Party politician 
Paul Vrolijk (born 1964), Dutch Anglican Archdeacon of North West Europe
Ton Vrolijk (born 1958), Dutch track cyclist
Vrolik
Agnites Vrolik (1810–1894), Dutch politician, Ministers of Finance 1854-58
Willem Vrolik (1801–1863), Dutch anatomist and pathologist

See also
Fröhlich, German surname of the same origin

References

Dutch-language surnames